Viktor Sergeyevich Melyokhin (born 16 December 2003) is a Russian football player who plays as a centre-back for FC Rostov.

Club career
He made his debut in the Russian Premier League for FC Rostov on 22 August 2021 in a game against FC Nizhny Novgorod. He substituted Dennis Hadžikadunić at half-time. He made his first starting appearance in the next game against FC Ural Yekaterinburg on 27 August 2021.

On 15 April 2022, Melyokhin signed a new five-year contract with Rostov.

Career statistics

References

External links
 
 
 

2003 births
Living people
Russian footballers
Russia youth international footballers
Russia under-21 international footballers
Association football defenders
FC Rostov players
Russian Premier League players